The 2021–22 Liechtenstein Cup was the 77th season of Liechtenstein's annual cup competition. Seven clubs competed with a total of 16 teams for one spot in the second qualifying round of the 2022–23 UEFA Europa Conference League. FC Vaduz were the defending champions.

Participating clubs 

TH Title holders.

First round 
The first round involved all except the eight highest-placed teams. The draw took place on August 4, 2021.

|colspan="3" style="background-color:#99CCCC" align=center|28 September 2021

|-
|colspan="3" style="background-color:#99CCCC" align=center|29 September 2021

Second round 
The draw took place on October 4, 2021.

|colspan="3" style="background-color:#99CCCC" align=center|29 October 2021

|-
|colspan="3" style="background-color:#99CCCC" align=center|2 November 2021

|-
|colspan="3" style="background-color:#99CCCC" align=center|3 November 2021

|-
|colspan="3" style="background-color:#99CCCC" align=center|10 November 2021

Quarter-finals
The quarter-finals involved the four teams who won in the second round, as well as the top four highest placed teams (FC Vaduz, FC Balzers, USV Eschen/Mauren and FC Ruggell). The draw took place on November 23, 2021.

|colspan="3" style="background-color:#99CCCC; text-align:center;"| 15 March 2022

|-
|colspan="3" style="background-color:#99CCCC; text-align:center;"| 16 March 2022

|}

Semi-finals
The semi-finals involved the four teams who won in the quarter-final round.

|colspan="3" style="background-color:#99CCCC; text-align:center;"| 15 April 2022

|}

Final
The final match involved 2 teams who won the semi-finals, that is FC Vaduz and USV Eschen/Mauren.

|colspan="3" style="background-color:#99CCCC; text-align:center;"| 3 May 2022

|}

References

External links 
 
Soccerway

Liechtenstein Football Cup seasons
Cup
Liechtenstein Cup